Ospreyella is a genus of brachiopods belonging to the family Thecideidae.

Species:

Ospreyella depressa 
Ospreyella maldiviana 
Ospreyella mayottensis 
Ospreyella mutiara 
Ospreyella palauensis

References

Brachiopod genera